Henry James Houghton was an Australian geographer who served as the Surveyor General of Western Australia from 1991 to 2001.

Biography 

He was born in Australia to Australian parents.

He died in Australia.

Career  

In 1991, he was appointed as the Surveyor General of Western Australia by the department of land administration under the terms of the Licensed Surveyors Act 1909.

His tenure ended in 2001 and he was succeeded by Eugene Michael Browne.

He also served in World War Two.

See also 

 List of pastoral leases in Western Australia
 Surveyor General of Western Australia

References

External links 
 
 

Australian geographers
Australian surveyors
Surveyors General of Western Australia